Beta Broadcasting System, Inc. is a Philippine radio network. Its corporate office is located at #8 Elane St., Brgy. New Asinan, Olongapo and at 003 Upper Market, Camp Allen, Baguio. BBSI operates a number of stations across Northern Luzon.

BBSI Stations

AM Stations

FM Stations

References

Radio stations in the Philippines
Philippine radio networks